Viola Cheptoo Lagat (born 13 March 1989) is a Kenyan middle-distance runner specialising in the 1500 metres. She competed at the 2015 World Championships, 2016 World Indoor Championships and 2016 Summer Olympics.

She comes from a family of runners that includes sisters Mary Chepkemboi and Everlyne Lagat as well as brothers Robert Cheseret and Olympic medalist Bernard Lagat.

Competition record

Personal bests
Outdoor
 800 metres – 2:02.05 (Tomblaine 2015)
 1000 metres – 2:42.58 (Linz 2013)
 1500 metres – 4:04.10 (Lignano Sabbiadoro 2015)
 One mile – 4:28.82 (Rovereto 2016)
 3000 metres – 8:52.34 (Rieti 2013)
 5000 metres – 15:35.12 (Palo Alto 2014)
Indoor
 1000 metres – 2:40.72 (Boston 2014)
 1500 metres – 4:10.45 (Portland 2016)
 One mile – 4:29.87 (New York 2016)

References

External links
 
 
 
 
 

1989 births
Living people
People from Nandi County
Kenyan female middle-distance runners
World Athletics Championships athletes for Kenya
Athletes (track and field) at the 2016 Summer Olympics
Olympic athletes of Kenya
20th-century Kenyan women
21st-century Kenyan women